Hildegarde Dolson Lockridge (1908–1981) was a prolific writer whose career spanned nearly fifty years. Her work appeared in major magazines, plus she was the author of fifteen books—all published under her maiden name of Hildegarde Dolson.

Early life

Hildegarde was born and raised in Franklin, Pennsylvania, the oldest of four children born to Clifford and Katherine Dolson. From 1926 to 1929 she attended Allegheny College, in Meadville, Pennsylvania, but left at the beginning of her senior year to live in New York City. She would later joke: "The day I arrived in New York, in October 1929, the stock market crashed with a bang."

After holding down numerous jobs, Dolson found work as an advertising copywriter for Gimbels, Macy's, Franklin-Simon, and Bamberger stores. She sold her first manuscript to The New Yorker, and was later published in other major magazines, including Harper's, Ladies Home Journal, McCall's, and Reader's Digest. After her first book was published in 1938, Dolson became a full-time freelance writer.

Marriage to Richard Lockridge

Dolson once wrote "I'm a self-made spinster who crows too much about it, especially when I get paid by the word." She had at least one article published on the subject of why she should never marry.

In 1965, when she was 56, she met mystery writer Richard Lockridge, and Lockridge quickly decided he wanted to marry her. Dolson loved her Greenwich Village apartment, and Mr. Lockridge lived in the country. He had two beloved Siamese cats, and she preferred dogs.

Despite the obstacles, within a few months of their first meeting Lockridge and Miss Dolson married in May 1965. Lockridge would refer to Hildegarde as either Hildy, or The Lady.

Hildegarde Dolson Lockridge died on January 15, 1981, at St. Luke's Hospital in Columbus, North Carolina. She was 72 years old, and had been living in Tyron, North Carolina.

Published books

 How About a Man, 1938
 We Shook the Family Tree, 1946
 The Husband Who Ran Away, 1948
 The Form Divine, 1951
 Sorry To Be So Cheerful, 1955
 My Brother Adlai (with Elizabeth Stevenson), 1956
 A Growing Wonder, 1957
 The Great Oildorado: The Gaudy & Turbulent Years of the First Oil Rush: Pennsylvania 1859–1880, 1959
 William Penn, Quaker Hero, 1961
 Guess Whose Hair I'm Wearing, 1963
 Adventures of a Light-Headed Blonde, 1964
 Disaster at Johnstown, The Great Flood, 1965
 Open the Door, 1966
 Heat Lightning, 1970
 To Spite Her Face, 1971
 A Dying Fall, 1973
 Please Omit Funeral, 1975
 Beauty Sleep, 1977
 "How Beautiful With Mud", 1978

External links

References

1908 births
1981 deaths
20th-century American writers
Writers from Pennsylvania
People from Franklin, Pennsylvania
20th-century American women writers